Herbert Leo Gelernter (December 17, 1929 – May 28, 2015) was a professor in the Computer Science Department of Stony Brook University.

Short biography
Having taken his B.S. in 1951 from Brooklyn College, Gelernter received his Ph.D. at the University of Rochester in 1957.

Gelernter's extended visit to the European Organization for Nuclear Research (CERN) in 1960/61, while he was developing a prototype of his 'vidicon' (a system which dispensed with film, and used a television-camera tube to record a spark-chamber event and store it as digitized data on magnetic tape) stimulated the development of a data-handling system for spark chambers in early 1961.

During his time at IBM, he wrote some of the first artificial intelligence software—his "geometry machine" was the first advanced AI program, and the third AI program ever. He implemented, with Nathaniel Rochester, a computer language for  list processing within FORTRAN. The work for this was done with Carl Gerberich at IBM, to this end producing the Fortran list processing language (FLPL). His most ambitious project during his tenure at Stony Brook University was the SYNCHEM expert problem-solving system for the discovery of potential routes to the total synthesis of organic molecules through a self-guided intelligent search and application of its large knowledge base of graph transforms, rules and sophisticated heuristics representing generalized organic reactions organized around recognized functional groups.

In 1952, Gelernter married Ruth, a daughter of rabbi Theodore Norton Lewis. His sons are the geneticist and Yale professor Joel Gelernter and the computer scientist and social commentator David Gelernter, also a Yale professor. His daughter Judith is a research scientist in the Information Technology Laboratory at the National Institute of Standards and Technology. Gelernter died on May 28, 2015.

Further reading
H. Gelernter;J. R. Hansen & C. L. Gerberich, "A Fortran-Compiled List-Processing Language", ACM Digital Library (volume 7 issue 2, April 1960), International Business Machines Co., Yorktown Heights, N.Y.  October 26, 2011
Gelernter, H. L., Rochester, N., "Intelligent Behavior in Problem-Solving Machines", IBM Journal of Research and Development, Oct. 1958;  doi 10.1147/rd.24.0336  retrieved 17:19 (GMT) October 26, 2011
H Gelernter, "Realization of a geometry theorem proving machine",  IFIP Congress 1959,  retrieved 17:39 26 October 2011
H. Gelernter; J. R. Hansen; D. W. Loveland, Empirical explorations of the geometry theorem machine,  IBM Research Center, Yorktown Heights, New York retrieved 17:44(GMT) October 26, 2011

See also
List of Jewish American computer scientists
History of artificial intelligence
Timeline of artificial intelligence

References 

American computer scientists
Artificial intelligence researchers
2015 deaths
Stony Brook University faculty
People associated with CERN
1929 births